The 2002–03 Luxembourg Cup was the 10th playing of the Luxembourg Cup ice hockey tournament. Six teams participated in the tournament, which was won by Tornado Luxembourg.

Final standings

References 

Luxembourg Cup
Luxembourg Cup (ice hockey) seasons